InterSystems HealthShare is a healthcare informatics platform for hospitals, integrated delivery networks (IDNs) and regional and national health information exchanges (HIE).

About 
HealthShare includes health information exchange, data aggregation, workflow, text analysis, and analytics technology. It connects to internal and external systems for HIE, and offers an integrated, universal view of all the data. HealthShare enables healthcare professionals to leverage their existing systems and the vast amounts of untapped health information contained within them to support secure data exchange and messaging and connections to other HIEs. The software also offers a real-time analytics component, called Active Analytics, that continuously collects, aggregates, normalizes, and presents data from across and beyond the organization. Because it is designed as a series of components that work securely together, HealthShare can be configured in a variety of ways, from clinical document sharing to fully integrated private or public health information exchange. HealthShare components include:

 Foundation
 Composite Health Record
 Clinician Viewer
 Patient Index
 Provider Directory
 Terminology Engine
 Consent Management
 Clinical Message Delivery
 Active Analytics

InterSystems HealthShare has been implemented in the State of Missouri, State of Illinois, State of Rhode Island, New York eHealth Collaborative, Brooklyn Health Information Exchange (BHIX)  HealthIX, Health Information Xchange of New York (Hixny), Beaumont Health System

Architecture
The HealthShare standards-based interoperability framework provides a scalable, foundation for health information exchange. It connects data, applications, processes, and users internally and externally of an organization.

Supported standards include:
 HL7
 FHIR
 IHE
 CDA
 CCD
 DICOM
 X12
 NwHIN Direct
 ITK (United Kingdom)
 NEHTA (Australia)
 DMP (France)

Competitors
The main competitors are vendors of other integration engines for healthcare such as Optum, eClinical Works, dbMotion, and MEDecision.

References

External links
InterSystems HealthShare
InterSystems HealthShare Case Studies

Business software
Proprietary software